Karen Katen (born 1948, St. Louis, MO) is an American pharmaceutical executive who spent most of her career with Pfizer, rising eventually to Vice-Chairman of the company and President of the pharmaceuticals division.

Career 
Katen received a B.A. in political science and an MBA from the University of Chicago in 1970-1974. She joined Pfizer in 1974, and steadily rose through the ranks, becoming President of Pharmaceuticals in 1995. Launches by Pfizer during her tenure included Lipitor and Viagra.During her leadership, Pfizer’s U.S. Pharmaceuticals Group achieved record financial performance each ear, with 1999 revenues over $9.2 billion. Following this, with Pfizer’s acquisition of Warner Lambert, Katen managed the largest integration in the history of the U.S. pharmaceutical industry. 

During the early 2000s, Katen was one of three Vice-Chairmen widely speculated to vie for the CEO position when then-CEO Henry "Hank" McKinnell Jr. was set to retire. When Jeffrey Kindler was instead named CEO in 2006, Katen chose to leave the company.

Since 2006, Katen's interests have shifted to service on multiple Boards of Directors; she currently sits on the boards of The Home Depot, Air Liquide, Takeda Pharmaceuticals, and several charitable causes.

Awards 

 2003 - Sixth Most Powerful Woman in Business, Fortune magazine
 2002 - 25 Top Executives, BusinessWeek
 1990 - Inaugural Healthcare Businesswoman's Association "Woman of the Year"

References 

Living people
American business executives
1948 births
Date of birth missing (living people)
Businesspeople from St. Louis
Pfizer people
Air Liquide people
The Home Depot people
Takeda Pharmaceutical Company people
University of Chicago alumni
American corporate directors